The Clean-Up is a 1917 American silent comedy Western film directed by William Worthington and starring Franklyn Farnum, Agnes Vernon and Mark Fenton.

Cast
 Franklyn Farnum as Stuart Adams
 Agnes Vernon as Hazel Richards 
 Mark Fenton as James Richards
 Mae Talbot as Mrs. Richards 
 Martha Mattox as Miss Richards
 Claire McDowell as Vera Vincent
 Clyde Benson as Joe Byers
 Albert MacQuarrie as Ed Linder
 William Human as Wilbur McBean

References

Bibliography
 Robert B. Connelly. The Silents: Silent Feature Films, 1910-36, Volume 40, Issue 2. December Press, 1998.

External links
 

1917 films
1917 Western (genre) films
1917 comedy films
1910s English-language films
American black-and-white films
Universal Pictures films
Films directed by William Worthington
Silent American Western (genre) comedy films
1910s Western (genre) comedy films
1910s American films